United American Patriots (UAP) is an American nonprofit organization which advocates and funds legal defense for American servicemembers they believe to have been unjustly convicted and wrongfully imprisoned on war crimes charges. Herbert Donahue, a retired U.S. Marine Corps major who served in the Vietnam War, founded the group in 2005. Retired Marine Lt. Col. David "Bull" Gurfein serves as CEO. They have advocated on behalf of such American servicemembers as Robert Bales, Corey Clagett, Derrick Miller, Clint Lorance, and Eddie Gallagher.

In 2016, The New York Times reported on UAP's collaboration the Combat Clemency Project, a student group at the University of Chicago Law School.

References

External links
 

2005 establishments in the United States
Legal advocacy organizations in the United States
United States military support organizations
Non-profit organizations based in the United States